Jean Émile Reymond (2 May 1912 – 12 April 1992) was a Monacan politician who was the minister of state for the country. He was in office from August 16, 1963 until December 29, 1966. Born on May 2, 1912, Reymond died in 1992.

References

Ministers of State of Monaco
1912 births
1986 deaths